The bacterial, archaeal and plant plastid code (translation table 11) is the DNA code used by bacteria, archaea, prokaryotic viruses and chloroplast proteins. It is essentially the same as the standard code, however there are some variations in alternative start codons.

The code

As in the standard code, initiation is most efficient at AUG.  In addition, GUG and UUG starts are documented in archaea and bacteria.  In Escherichia coli, UUG is estimated to serve as initiator for about 3% of the bacterium's proteins.  CUG is known to function as an initiator for one plasmid-encoded protein (RepA) in E. coli. In addition to the NUG initiations, in rare cases bacteria can initiate translation from an AUU codon as e.g. in the case of poly(A) polymerase PcnB and the InfC gene that codes for translation initiation factor IF3.  The internal assignments are the same as in the standard code though UGA codes at low efficiency for tryptophan in Bacillus subtilis and, presumably, in Escherichia coli.

See also
 List of genetic codes

References

Molecular genetics
Gene expression
Protein biosynthesis